Paul Mensah (born 13 October 1999) is a Ghanaian professional footballer who plays as a forward for Blau-Weiß Linz.

References

External links
 

1999 births
Living people
Ghanaian footballers
Association football forwards
Liga I players
FC Botoșani players
Ghanaian expatriate footballers
Ghanaian expatriate sportspeople in Spain
Expatriate footballers in Spain
Ghanaian expatriate sportspeople in Romania
Expatriate footballers in Romania